Universal love may refer to:
 Universal Love, a 1975 album by MFSB
 Universal Love – Wedding Songs Reimagined, a 2018 album of same-sex wedding songs by various artists
 Universalove, a 2008 Austrian romantic tragedy film

See also
 Agape, a Greco-Christian term referring to love, "the highest form of love, charity" and "the love of God for man and of man for God"
 Charity (virtue), a virtue in Christianity
 Mohism, an ancient Chinese philosophy